The Pathfinder Atomic Power Plant was a nuclear power plant built by Northern States Power Company. It was located just northeast of Sioux Falls, South Dakota, and west of its suburb of Brandon. It was named for the 19th century explorer John C. "Pathfinder" Fremont and was constructed in the mid-1960s in partnership with a group of other investor-owned utilities. The main goal of this facility was to be a 'proof of concept' plant to gain practical experience in operating a nuclear plant. Some of the other participating utilities would also go on to build their own plants. Although the superheater developed by Allis-Chalmers was plagued with technical difficulties and which led to NSP's eventual decision to retire the reactor by 1967 (and convert the plant to run on gas and oil by 1968), the lessons NSP learned from Pathfinder served the company in its operation of the Prairie Island and Monticello nuclear plants. The longest Pathfinder ever ran at its full rated power was 30 minutes, and it was only then the company found the flaws that led to the decision to retire the reactor. After sitting idle for 23 years, the reactor vessel was removed from the plant in 1990 and transported to a low-level radioactive material dump in Washington.

Pathfinder would continue as an oil- or gas-fired peaking plant until it was retired in the early 2000s after its cooling tower collapsed in July 2000. In 1994 the Angus C. Anson Generating Station was built at the same site. Its namesake was NSP's South Dakota division manager Angus C. Anson (1954–1993), who was killed in the plane crash that also killed South Dakota governor George S. Mickelson.

See also

List of nuclear reactors

References

External links
 Pathfinder on http://www.nukeworker.com/
NSP: An Illustrated History of Northern States Power Company (NSP, 1999)

Energy infrastructure completed in 1966
Former nuclear power stations in the United States
Buildings and structures in Sioux Falls, South Dakota
Buildings and structures in Minnehaha County, South Dakota
Nuclear power plants in South Dakota
1966 establishments in South Dakota
1967 disestablishments in South Dakota